Navajo is a 1952 American fictional drama film directed by Norman Foster. It was nominated for two Academy Awards: for Best Documentary Feature (although it's not a documentary) and Best Cinematography. The Academy Film Archive preserved Navajo in 2012.

It is a story about "Son of the Hunter", a seven-year-old Navajo boy whose father abandoned the family, then his de facto grandfather dies. When he goes to the trading post to get help, he is captured by the authorities and is forced to attend a reservation boarding school. While there, his mother and one of his two sisters die of an undiagnosed malady. He escapes from the school and returns to the wilderness to try to live an independent life.

The Hollywood Foreign Press Association presented 8-year-old actor Francis Kee Teller with an honorary award at the 1953 Golden Globe Awards

The film was restored by Kit Parker Films in 2020 and released on home video for the first time. The release includes a 1952 documentary called Our Navajo Neighbors.

Cast
 Hall Bartlett as Indian School Counselor
 Francis Kee Teller as "Son of the Hunter"
 Sammy Ogg as Narrator
 John Mitchell as Grey Singer (the de facto grandfather of "Son of the Hunter")
 Mrs. Kee Teller as "Good Weaver" (the mother of "Son of the Hunter")
 Eloise Teller and Linda Teller as the sisters of "Son of the Hunter"

References

External links

Navajo (parts one and two) at the American Indian Film Gallery, University of Arizona

1952 films
1952 documentary films
American documentary films
American black-and-white films
1950s English-language films
Documentary films about Native Americans
Films directed by Norman Foster
Films scored by Leith Stevens
Lippert Pictures films
1950s American films